Social democracy is a political, social, and economic philosophy within socialism that supports political and economic democracy. As a policy regime, it is described by academics as advocating economic and social interventions to promote social justice within the framework of a liberal-democratic polity and a capitalist-oriented mixed economy. The protocols and norms used to accomplish this involve a commitment to representative and participatory democracy, measures for income redistribution, regulation of the economy in the general interest, and social welfare provisions. Due to longstanding governance by social democratic parties during the post-war consensus and their influence on socioeconomic policy in Northern and Western Europe, social democracy became associated with Keynesianism, the Nordic model, the social-liberal paradigm, and welfare states within political circles in the late 20th century. It has been described as the most common form of Western or modern socialism, as well as the reformist wing of democratic socialism.

The history of social democracy stretches back to the 19th-century labour movement. It is a left-wing political ideology that advocates for a peaceful democratic evolution from laissez-faire or crony capitalism towards social capitalism sometimes also referred to as a social market economy. Social democracy opposes the full centralization of an economy as proposed by some socialists. The main difference between social democracy and democratic socialism is that democratic socialism is a political philosophy within socialism, advocating an evolutionary and peaceful transition from capitalism to socialism, using established political processes, as opposed to the revolutionary socialist approach to transition associated with orthodox Marxism. On the other hand, social democracy seeks to improve the lives of people living within a free and democratic society, by having a well regulated market economy. 
In the early post-war era in Western Europe, social democratic parties rejected the Stalinist political and economic model then-current in the Soviet Union, committing themselves either to an alternative path to socialism or a compromise between capitalism and socialism. In this period, social democrats embraced a mixed economy based on the predominance of private property, with only a minority of essential utilities and public services under public ownership. Social democrats promoted Keynesian economics, state interventionism, and the welfare state while placing less emphasis on the goal of replacing the capitalist system (factor markets, private property, and wage labour) with a qualitatively different socialist economic system. Along with communism, social democracy became the dominant political tendency within the international socialist movement by the early 1920s.

While retaining socialism as a long-term goal, social democracy is distinguished from some modern forms of democratic socialism for seeking to humanize capitalism and create the conditions for it to lead to greater democratic, egalitarian, and solidaristic outcomes. It is characterized by a commitment to policies aimed at curbing inequality, eliminating oppression of underprivileged groups, and eradicating poverty, as well as support for universally accessible public services like child care, education, elderly care, health care, and workers' compensation. It has strong connections with the labour movement and trade unions, being supportive of collective bargaining rights for workers and measures to extend decision-making beyond politics into the economic sphere in the form of co-determination, or social ownership, for employees and stakeholders.

The Third Way, which ostensibly aims to fuse liberal economics with social democratic welfare policies, is an ideology that developed in the 1990s and is sometimes associated with social democratic parties; some analysts have characterized the Third Way as part of the neoliberal movement.

Overview

Definition 
Social democracy is defined as one of many socialist traditions. As a political movement, it aims to achieve socialism through gradual and democratic means. This definition goes back to the influence of both the reformist socialism of Ferdinand Lassalle and the internationalist revolutionary socialism advanced by Karl Marx and Friedrich Engels, by whom social democracy was influenced. As an international political movement and ideology, social democracy has undergone various major forms throughout its history. Whereas in the 19th century, it was "organized Marxism", social democracy became "organized reformism" by the 20th century. As a policy regime, social democracy entails support for a mixed economy and ameliorative measures to benefit the working class within the framework of democratic capitalism. By the 21st century, a social democratic policy regime is generally defined as an increase in welfare policies or an increase in public services and may be used synonymously with the Nordic model.

In political science, democratic socialism and social democracy are largely seen as synonyms, while they are distinguished in journalistic use. Under this democratic socialist definition, social democracy is an ideology seeking to gradually build an alternative socialist economy through the institutions of liberal democracy. Starting in the post-war period, social democracy was defined as a policy regime advocating the reformation of capitalism to align it with the ethical ideals of social justice. In the 19th century, it encompassed various non-revolutionary and revolutionary currents of socialism, excluding anarchism. In the early 20th century, social democracy came to refer to support for a process of developing society through existing political structures and opposition to revolutionary means, which are often associated with Marxism.

Political party 
Social Democratic is the name of socialist parties in several countries. The term came to be associated with the positions of the German and Swedish parties. The first advocated revisionist Marxism, while the second advocated a comprehensive welfare state. By the 21st century, parties advocating social democracy include Labour, Left, and some Green parties. Most social democratic parties consider themselves democratic socialists and are categorized as socialists. They continue to reference socialism, either as a post-capitalist order or, in more ethical terms, as a just society, described as representing democratic socialism, without any explicit reference to the economic system or its structure. Parties such as the Social Democratic Party of Germany and the Swedish Social Democratic Party describe their goal as developing democratic socialism, with social democracy as the principle of action. In the 21st century, European social democratic parties represent the centre-left and most are part of the European Socialist Party, while democratic socialist parties are to their left within the Party of the European Left. Many of those social democratic parties are members of the Socialist International, including several democratic socialist parties, whose Frankfurt Declaration declares the goal of developing democratic socialism. Others are also part of the Progressive Alliance, founded in 2013 by most contemporary or former member parties of the Socialist International.

What socialists such as anarchists, communists, social democrats, syndicalists, and some social democratic proponents of the Third Way share in common is history, specifically that they can all be traced back to the individuals, groups, and literature of the First International, and have retained some of the terminology and symbolism such as the colour red. How far society should intervene and whether the government, mainly the existing government, is the right vehicle for change are issues of disagreement. As the Historical Dictionary of Socialism summarizes, "there were general criticisms about the social effects of the private ownership and control of capital", "a general view that the solution to these problems lay in some form of collective control (with the degree of control varying among the proponents of socialism) over the means of production, distribution, and exchange", and "there was agreement that the outcomes of this collective control should be a society that provided social equality and justice, economic protection, and generally a more satisfying life for most people". Socialism became a catch-all term for the critics of capitalism and industrial society. Social democrats are anticapitalists insofar as criticism about "poverty, low wages, unemployment, economic and social inequality, and a lack of economic security" is linked to the private ownership of the means of production.

Terminology 
In the 19th century, social democrat was a broad catch-all for international socialists owing their primary ideological allegiance to Lassalle or Marx, in contrast to those advocating various forms of utopian socialism. In one of the first scholarly works on European socialism written for an American audience, Richard T. Ely's 1883 book French and German Socialism in Modern Times, social democrats were characterized as "the extreme wing of the socialists" who were "inclined to lay so much stress on equality of enjoyment, regardless of the value of one's labor, that they might, perhaps, more properly be called communists". Many parties in this era described themselves as Social Democrats, including the General German Workers' Association and the Social Democratic Workers' Party of Germany, which merged to form the Social Democratic Party of Germany, the Social Democratic Federation in Britain, and the Russian Social Democratic Labour Party. Social Democrat continued to be used in this context until the Bolshevik Revolution of October 1917, when Communist came into vogue for individuals and organizations espousing a revolutionary road to socialism.

Social democracy or social democratic remains controversial among socialists. Some define it as representing a Marxist faction and non-communist socialists or the right-wing of socialism during the split with communism. Others have noted its pejorative use among communists and other socialists. According to Lyman Tower Sargent, "socialism refers to social theories rather than to theories oriented to the individual. Because many communists now call themselves democratic socialists, it is sometimes difficult to know what a political label really means. As a result, social democratic has become a common new label for democratic socialist political parties."

Marxist revisionism 
Marxist revisionist Eduard Bernstein's views influenced and laid the groundwork for developing post-war social democracy as a policy regime, Labour revisionism, and the neo-revisionism of the Third Way. This definition of social democracy is focused on ethical terms, with the type of socialism advocated being ethical and liberal. Bernstein described socialism and social democracy in particular as organized liberalism; in this sense, liberalism is the predecessor and precursor of socialism, whose restricted view of freedom is to be socialized, while democracy must entail social democracy. For those social democrats, who still describe and see themselves as socialists, socialism is used in ethical or moral terms, representing democracy, egalitarianism, and social justice rather than a specifically socialist economic system. Under this type of definition, social democracy's goal is that of advancing those values within a capitalist market economy, as its support for a mixed economy no longer denotes the coexistence between private and public ownership or that between planning and market mechanisms but rather, it represents free markets combined with government intervention and regulations.

Social democracy has been seen as a revision of orthodox Marxism, although this has been described as misleading for modern social democracy. Some distinguish between ideological social democracy as part of the broad socialist movement and social democracy as a policy regime. The first is called classical social democracy or classical socialism, contrasted with competitive socialism, liberal socialism, neo-social democracy, and new social democracy.

Philosophy 
As a form of reformist democratic socialism, social democracy rejects the either/or interpretation of capitalism versus socialism. It claims that fostering a progressive evolution of capitalism will gradually result in the evolution of a capitalist economy into a socialist economy. All citizens should be legally entitled to certain social rights: universal access to public services such as education, health care, workers' compensation, and other services, including child care and care for the elderly. Social democrats advocate freedom from discrimination based on differences in ability/disability, age, ethnicity, gender, language, race, religion, sexual orientation, and social class.

Later in their life, Karl Marx and Friedrich Engels argued that in some countries, workers might be able to achieve their aims through peaceful means. In this sense, Engels argued that socialists were evolutionists, although both Marx and Engels remained committed to social revolution. In developing social democracy, Eduard Bernstein rejected orthodox Marxism's revolutionary and materialist foundations. Rather than class conflict and socialist revolution, Bernstein's Marxist revisionism reflected that socialism could be achieved through cooperation between people regardless of class. Nonetheless, Bernstein paid deference to Marx, describing him as the father of social democracy but declaring that it was necessary to revise Marx's thought in light of changing conditions. Influenced by the gradualist platform favoured by the Fabian movement in Britain, Bernstein advocated a similar evolutionary approach to socialist politics that he termed evolutionary socialism. Evolutionary means include representative democracy and cooperation between people regardless of class. Bernstein accepted the Marxist analysis that the creation of socialism is interconnected with the evolution of capitalism.

August Bebel, Bernstein, Engels, Wilhelm Liebknecht, Marx, and Carl Wilhelm Tölcke are all considered founders of social democracy in Germany. However, Bernstein and Lassalle, along with labourists and reformists such as Louis Blanc in France, led to the widespread association of social democracy with socialist reformism. While Lassalle was a reformist state socialist, Bernstein predicted a long-term coexistence of democracy with a mixed economy during the reforming of capitalism into socialism and argued that socialists needed to accept this. This mixed economy would involve public, cooperative, and private enterprises, and it would be necessary for an extended period before private enterprises evolve of their own accord into cooperative enterprises. Bernstein supported state ownership only for certain parts of the economy that the state could best manage and rejected a mass scale of state ownership as being too burdensome to be manageable. Bernstein was an advocate of Kantian socialism and neo-Kantianism. Although unpopular early on, his views became mainstream after World War I.

In The Future of Socialism (1956), Anthony Crosland argued that "traditional capitalism has been reformed and modified almost out of existence, and it is with a quite different form of society that socialists must now concern themselves. Pre-war anti-capitalism will give us very little help", for a new kind of capitalism required a new kind of socialism. Crosland believed that these features of reformed managerial capitalism were irreversible, but it has been argued within the Labour Party and by others that Margaret Thatcher and Ronald Reagan brought about its reversal in the 1970s and 1980s. Although the post-war consensus represented a period where social democracy was "most buoyant", it has been argued that "post-war social democracy had been altogether too confident in its analysis" because "gains which were thought to be permanent turned out to be conditional and as the reservoir of capitalist growth showed signs of drying up". In Socialism Now (1974), Crosland argued that "[m]uch more should have been achieved by a Labour Government in office and Labour pressure in opposition. Against the dogged resistance to change, we should have pitted a stronger will to change. I conclude that a move to the Left is needed".

In Origin, Ideology and Transformation of Political Parties: East-Central and Western Europe Compared, Vít Hloušek and Lubomír Kopecek explain how socialist parties have evolved from the 19th to the early 21st centuries. As the number of people in traditional working-class occupations such as factory workers and miners declined, socialists have successfully widened their appeal to the middle class by diluting their ideology; however, there is still continuity between parties such as the SPD, the Labour Party in Britain, and other socialist parties which remain part of the same famille spirituelle, or ideological party family, as outlined by most political scientists. For many social democrats, Marxism is loosely held to be valuable for its emphasis on changing the world for a more just, better future.

Development 

During the late 19th century and the early 20th century, social democracy was a broad labour movement within socialism that aimed to replace private ownership with social ownership of the means of production, distribution and exchange, taking influence from both Marxism and the supporters of Ferdinand Lassalle. By 1868–1869, the socialism associated with Karl Marx had become the official theoretical basis of the first social democratic party established in Europe, the Social Democratic Workers' Party of Germany. By the early 20th century, the German social democratic politician Eduard Bernstein rejected the ideas in orthodox Marxism that proposed specific historical progression and revolution as a means to achieve social equality, advancing the position that socialism should be grounded in ethical and moral arguments for social justice and egalitarianism that are to be achieved through gradual legislative reform. Following the split between reformist and revolutionary socialists in the Second International, socialist parties influenced by Bernstein rejected revolutionary politics in favour of parliamentary reform while remaining committed to socialization.

During the 1920s and 1930s, social democracy became dominant in the socialist movement, mainly associated with reformist socialism while communism represented revolutionary socialism. Under the influence of politicians like Carlo Rosselli in Italy, social democrats began disassociating themselves from orthodox Marxism altogether as represented by Marxism–Leninism, embracing liberal socialism, Keynesianism, and appealing to morality rather than any consistent systematic, scientific, or materialist worldview. Social democracy appealed to communitarian, corporatist, and sometimes nationalist sentiments while rejecting the economic and technological determinism generally characteristic of orthodox Marxism and economic liberalism.

By the post-World War II period and its economic consensus and expansion, most social democrats in Europe had abandoned their ideological connection to orthodox Marxism. They shifted their emphasis toward social policy reform as a compromise between capitalism to socialism. According to Michael Harrington, the primary reason for this was the perspective that viewed the Stalinist-era Soviet Union as having succeeded in usurping the legacy of Marxism and distorting it in propaganda to justify totalitarianism. In its foundation, the Socialist International denounced the Bolshevik-inspired communist movement, "for [it] falsely claims a share in the Socialist tradition". Furthermore, core tenets of Marxism have been regarded by social democrats as having become obsolete, including the prediction that the working class was the decisive class with the development of capitalism. In their view, this did not materialize in the aftermath of mass industrialization during World War II.

During the Third Way development of social democracy, social democrats adjusted to the neoliberal political climate that had existed since the 1980s. Those social democrats recognized that outspoken opposition to capitalism was politically non-viable and that accepting the powers that be, seeking to challenge free-market and laissez-faire variations of capitalism, was a more immediate concern. The Third Way stands for a modernized social democracy, but the social democracy that remained committed to the gradual abolition of capitalism and social democrats opposed to the Third Way merged into democratic socialism. Although social democracy originated as a revolutionary socialist or communist movement, one distinction between democratic socialism and social democracy is that the former can include revolutionary means. The latter proposes representative democracy under the rule of law as the only acceptable constitutional form of government.

Social democracy has been described as the evolutionary form of democratic socialism that aims to gradually and peacefully achieve socialism through established political processes rather than social revolution as advocated by revolutionary socialists. In this sense, social democracy is synonymous with democratic socialism and represents its original form, that of socialism achieved by democratic means, usually through the parliament. While social democrats continue to call and describe themselves as democratic socialists or simply socialists, with time, the post-war association of social democracy as a policy regime, and the development of the Third Way, democratic socialism has come to include communist and revolutionary tendencies, representing the original meaning of social democracy, as the latter has shifted towards reformism.

Communism and the Third Way 

Before social democracy was associated with a policy regime with a specific set of socioeconomic policies, its economics ranged from communism to syndicalism and the guild socialists, who rejected or were opposed to the approach of some Fabians, regarded as being "an excessively bureaucratic and insufficiently democratic prospect". Communists and revolutionary socialists were a significant part of social democracy and represented its revolutionary wing. Although they remained committed to social democracy representing the highest form of democracy, social democracy became associated with its reformist wing since the communist split starting in 1917.

The Russian Revolution further exacerbated this division, resulting in a split between those supporting the October Revolution renaming themselves as Communist and those opposing the Bolshevik development (favouring the liberal social democratic development as argued by the Mensheviks) remaining with the Social Democrat label. Rather than abandoning social democracy, Communists remained committed to revolutionary social democracy, merging into communism; however, they saw Social Democrat associated with reformism, found it irredeemably lost and chose Communist to represent their views. For the Communists, the Social Democrats betrayed the world's working class by supporting the imperialist Great War and leading their national governments into the war. The Communists also criticized their reformism, arguing that it represented "reformism without reforms". This reformist–revolutionary division culminated in the German Revolution of 1919, in which the Communists wanted to overthrow the German government to turn it into a soviet republic like it was done in Russia, while the Social Democrats wanted to preserve it as what came to be known as the Weimar Republic. Those revolutions transformed the social democracy from "Marxist revolutionary" into a form of "moderate parliamentary socialism".

While evolutionary and reformist social democrats believe that capitalism can be reformed into socialism, revolutionary social democrats argue that this is impossible and that a social revolution would still be necessary. The revolutionary criticism of reformism but not necessarily of reforms which are part of the class struggle goes back to Marx, who proclaimed that social democrats had to support the bourgeoisie wherever it acted as a revolutionary, progressive class because "bourgeois liberties had first to be conquered and then criticised". Internal rivalry in the social democratic movement within the Second International between reformists and revolutionaries resulted in the Communists, led by the Bolsheviks, founding their own separate Communist International (Comintern) in 1919 that sought to rally revolutionary social democrats together for socialist revolution. With this split, the social democratic movement was now dominated by reformists, who founded the Labour and Socialist International (LSI) in 1923. The LSI had a history of rivalry with the Comintern, with which it competed over the leadership of the international socialist and labour movement.

In Britain, the social democratic Gaitskellites emphasized the goals of personal liberty, social welfare, and social equality. The Gaitskellites were part of a political consensus between the Labour and Conservative parties, famously dubbed Butskellism. Some social democratic Third Way figures such as Anthony Giddens and Tony Blair, who has described himself as a Christian socialist and a socialist in ethical terms, insist that they are socialists, for they claim to believe in the same values that their anti-Third Way critics do. According to those self-proclaimed social democratic modernizers, Clause IV's open advocacy of state socialism was alienating potential middle-class Labour supporters, and nationalization policies had been so thoroughly attacked by neoliberal economists and politicians, including rhetorical comparisons by the right of state-owned industry in the West to that in the Soviet Union and the Eastern Bloc, and nationalizations and state socialism became unpopular. Thatcherite Conservatives were adept at condemning state-owned enterprises as economically inefficient. For the Gaitskellites, nationalization was not essential to achieve all major socialist objectives; public ownership and nationalization were not explicitly rejected but were seen as merely one of numerous useful devices. According to social democratic modernizers like Blair, nationalization policies had become politically unviable by the 1990s.

Some critics and analysts argue that many prominent social democratic parties, such as the Labour Party in Britain and the Social Democratic Party of Germany, even while maintaining references to socialism and declaring themselves democratic socialist parties, have abandoned socialism in practice, whether unwillingly or not.

Social democracy and democratic socialism 

Social democracy has some significant overlap in practical policy positions with democratic socialism, although they are usually distinguished from each other. In Britain, the revised version of Clause IV to the Labour Party Constitution, which was implemented in the 1990s by the New Labour faction led by Tony Blair, affirms a formal commitment to democratic socialism, describing it as a modernized form of social democracy; however, it no longer commits the party to public ownership of industry and in its place advocates "the enterprise of the market and the rigour of competition" along with "high quality public services either owned by the public or accountable to them". Many social democrats "refer to themselves as socialists or democratic socialists", and some such as Blair "use or have used these terms interchangeably". Others argue that "there are clear differences between the three terms, and preferred to describe their own political beliefs by using the term 'social democracy' only".

Democratic socialism represents social democracy before the 1970s, when the post-war displacement of Keynesianism by monetarism and neoliberalism caused many social democratic parties to adopt the Third Way ideology, accepting capitalism as the status quo for the time being and redefining socialism in a way that maintains the capitalist structure intact. Like modern social democracy, democratic socialism tends to follow a gradual or evolutionary path to socialism rather than a revolutionary one. Policies commonly supported are Keynesian and include some degree of regulation over the economy, social insurance schemes, public pension programs, and a gradual expansion of public ownership over major and strategic industries.

Internal debates 
During the late 20th century, those labels were embraced, contested and rejected due to the emergence of developments within the European left, such as Eurocommunism, the rise of neoliberalism, the fall of the Soviet Union and the Revolutions of 1989, the Third Way, and the rise of anti-austerity and Occupy movements due to the global financial crisis of 2007–2008 and the Great Recession, the causes of which have been attributed by some to the neoliberal shift and deregulation economic policies. This latest development contributed to the rise of politicians, such as Jeremy Corbyn in Britain and Bernie Sanders in the United States, who rejected centrist politicians that supported triangulation within the Labour and Democratic parties.

According to both right-wing critics and supporters alike, policies such as universal health care and education are "pure Socialism" because they are opposed to "the hedonism of capitalist society". Because of this overlap, democratic socialism refers to European socialism as represented by social democracy, especially in the United States, where it is tied to the New Deal. Some democratic socialists who follow social democracy support practical, progressive reforms of capitalism and are more concerned with administrating and humanising it, with socialism relegated to the indefinite future. Other democratic socialists want to go beyond mere meliorist reforms and advocate the systematic transformation of the mode of production from capitalism to socialism.

In the United States 
Despite the long history of overlap between the two, with social democracy considered a form of democratic or parliamentary socialism and social democrats calling themselves democratic socialists, democratic socialism is considered a misnomer in the United States. One issue is that social democracy is equated with wealthy countries in the Western world, especially in Northern and Western Europe, while democratic socialism is conflated either with the pink tide in Latin America, especially with Venezuela, or with communism in the form of Marxist–Leninist socialism as practised in the Soviet Union and other self-declared socialist states. Democratic socialism has been described as representing the left-wing or socialist tradition of the New Deal.

The lack of a strong and influential socialist movement in the United States has been linked to the Red Scare, and any ideology associated with socialism brings social stigma due to its association with authoritarian socialist states. Socialism has been used as a pejorative term by members of the political right to stop the implementation of liberal and progressive policies and proposals and to criticize the public figures trying to implement them. Although Americans may reject the idea that the United States has characteristics of a European-style social democracy, it has been argued by some observers that it has a comfortable social safety net, albeit severely underfunded in comparison to other Western countries. It has also been argued that many policies that may be considered socialist are popular but that socialism is not. Others, such as Tony Judt, described modern liberalism in the United States as representing European social democracy.

In South Africa 
South Africa has been governed by the African National Congress (ANC) a social-democratic party in power since 1994. In 2022, The World Economic Forum said that South Africa risks state collapse and identified five major risks facing the country. Former minister Jay Naidoo has said that South Africa is in serious trouble and is showing signs of a failed state, with record unemployment levels and the fact that many young people will not find a job in their lifetime.

Policy regime 
In the 21st century, it has become commonplace to reference social democracy as the European social democracies, namely the actually-existing states in Northern and Western European countries, usually in reference to their model of the welfare state and corporatist system of collective bargaining. European social democracies represent a socioeconomic order that has been described as starting in the 1930s, 1940s, or 1950s and ending in the 1970s, 1980s, or 1990s. Henning Meyer and Jonathan Rutherford associate social democracy with the socioeconomic order in Europe from the post-war period until the early 1990s. This has been accepted or adopted across the political spectrum, including conservatives (Christian democrats), liberals (social liberals), and socialists (social democrats); one notable difference is that socialists see the welfare state "not merely to provide benefits but to build the foundation for emancipation and self-determination". Social democratic roots are also observed in Latin America during the early 20th century; this was the case in Uruguay during the two presidential terms of José Batlle y Ordóñez.

Social democracy influenced the development of social corporatism, a form of economic tripartite corporatism based upon a social partnership between the interests of capital and labour, involving collective bargaining between representatives of employers and labour mediated by the government at the national level. During the post-war consensus, this form of social democracy has been a major component of the Nordic model and, to a lesser degree, the West European social market economies. The development of social corporatism began in Norway and Sweden in the 1930s and was consolidated in the 1960s and 1970s. The system was based upon the dual compromise of capital and labour as one component and the market and the state as the other. From the 1940s through the 1970s, defining features of social democracy as a policy regime included Keynesian economic policies and industrial agreements to balance the power of capital and labour and the welfare state. This is especially associated with the Swedish Social Democrats. In the 1970s, social corporatism evolved into neo-corporatism, which replaced it. Neo-corporatism has represented an important concept of Third Way social democracy. Social democratic theorist Robin Archer wrote about the importance of social corporatism to social democracy in his work Economic Democracy: The Politics of a Feasible Socialism (1995). As a welfare state, social democracy is a specific type of welfare state and policy regime described as being universalist, supportive of collective bargaining, and more supportive of public provision of welfare. It is especially associated with the Nordic model.

Social democracy rests on three fundamental features, namely "(1) democracy (e.g., equal rights to vote and form parties), (2) an economy partly regulated by the state (e.g., through Keynesianism), and (3) a welfare state offering social support to those in need (e.g., equal rights to education, health service, employment, and pensions)". In practice, social democratic parties have been instrumental in the social-liberal paradigm, lasting from the 1940s and 1970s, and called such because it was developed by social liberals but implemented by social democrats. Since those policies were mostly implemented by social democrats, social liberalism is sometimes called social democracy. In Britain, the social-liberal Beveridge Report drafted by the Liberal economist William Beveridge influenced the Labour Party's social policies, such as the National Health Service and Labour's welfare state development. This social-liberal paradigm represented the post-war consensus and was accepted across the political spectrum by conservatives, liberals and socialists until the 1970s. Similarly, the neoliberal paradigm, which replaced the previous paradigm, was accepted across the mainstream political parties, including social democratic supporters of the Third Way. This has caused much controversy within the social democratic movement.

Implementation 
From the late 19th century until the mid to late 20th century, there was greater public confidence in the idea of a state-managed economy that was a major pillar of communism, and to a substantial degree by conservatives and left-liberals. Aside from anarchists and other libertarian socialists, there was confidence amongst socialists in the concept of state socialism as being the most effective form of socialism. Some early British social democrats in the 19th century and 20th century, such as the Fabians, said that British society was already mostly socialist and that the economy was significantly socialist through government-run enterprises created by conservative and liberal governments which could be run for the interests of the people through their representatives' influence, an argument reinvoked by some socialists in post-war Britain. Advents in economics and observation of the failure of state socialism in the Eastern Bloc countries and the Western world with the crisis and stagflation of the 1970s, combined with the neoliberal rebuke of state interventionism, resulted in socialists re-evaluating and redesigning socialism. Some social democrats have sought to keep what they deem are socialism's core values while changing their position on state involvement in the economy and retaining significant social regulations.

When nationalization of large industries was relatively widespread in the 20th century until the 1970s, it was not uncommon for commentators to describe some European social democracies as democratic socialist states seeking to move their countries toward a socialist economy. In 1956, leading Labour Party politician and British author Anthony Crosland said that capitalism had been abolished in Britain, although others such as Welshman Aneurin Bevan, Minister of Health in the first post-war Labour government and the architect of the National Health Service, disputed the claim. For Crosland and others who supported his views, Britain was a socialist state. According to Bevan, Britain had a socialist National Health Service, which opposed the hedonism of Britain's capitalist society.

Although, as in the rest of Europe, the laws of capitalism still operated fully and private enterprise dominated the economy, some political commentators stated that during the post-war period, when social democratic parties were in power, countries such as Britain and France were democratic socialist states. The same claim has been applied to Nordic countries with the Nordic model. In the 1980s, the government of President François Mitterrand aimed to expand dirigism and attempted to nationalize all French banks, but this attempt faced opposition from the European Economic Community because it demanded a free-market economy among its members. Public ownership never accounted for more than 15–20% of capital formation, further dropping to 8% in the 1980s and below 5% in the 1990s after the rise of neoliberalism.

One issue of social democracy is the response to the collapse of legitimacy of state socialism and state-interventionist economics of Keynesianism with the discovery of the phenomenon of stagflation which has been an issue for the legitimacy of state socialism. This has provoked re-thinking of how socialism should be achieved by social democrats, including changing views by social democrats on private property—anti-Third Way social democrats such as Robert Corfe have advocated a socialist form of private property as part of new socialism (although Corfe technically objects to private property as a term to collectively describe property that is not publicly owned as being vague) and rejecting state socialism as a failure. Third Way social democracy was formed in response to what its proponents saw as a crisis in the legitimacy of socialism—especially state socialism—and the rising legitimacy of neoliberalism, especially laissez-faire capitalism. The Third Way's view of the crisis is criticized for being too simplistic. Others have criticized it because with the fall of state socialism, it was possible for "a new kind of 'third way' socialism (combining social ownership with markets and democracy), thereby heralding a revitalization of the social democratic tradition"; however, it has been argued that the prospect of a new socialism was "a chimera, a hopeful invention of Western socialists who had not understood how 'actually existing socialism' had totally discredited any version of socialism among those who had lived under it".

Analysis

Legacy 

Social democratic policies were first adopted in the German Empire between the 1880s and 1890s, when the conservative Chancellor Otto von Bismarck put in place many social welfare proposals initially suggested by the Social Democrats to hinder their electoral success after he instituted the Anti-Socialist Laws, laying the ground of the first modern welfare state. Those policies were dubbed State Socialism by the liberal opposition, but Bismarck later accepted and re-appropriated the term. It was a set of social programs implemented in Germany that Bismarck initiated in 1883 as remedial measures to appease the working class and reduce support for socialism and the Social Democrats following earlier attempts to achieve the same objective through Bismarck's Anti-Socialist Laws. This did not prevent the Social Democrats from becoming the biggest party in parliament by 1912.

Similar policies were later adopted in most of Western Europe, including France and the United Kingdom (the latter in the form of the Liberal welfare reforms), with both socialist and liberal parties adopting those policies. In the United States, the progressive movement, a similar social democratic movement predominantly influenced more by social liberalism than socialism, supported progressive liberals such as Democratic presidents Woodrow Wilson and Franklin D. Roosevelt, whose New Freedom and New Deal programmes adopted many social democratic policies. With the Great Depression, economic interventionism and nationalizations became more common worldwide and the post-war consensus until the 1970s saw Keynesian social democratic and mixed economy policies put in place, leading to the post-World War II boom in which the United States, the Soviet Union, the Western European, and East Asian countries experienced unusually high and sustained economic growth, together with full employment. Contrary to early predictions, this period of high economic growth and national development also included many countries that were devastated by the war, such as Japan (Japanese post-war economic miracle), West Germany and Austria (Wirtschaftswunder), South Korea (Miracle of the Han River), France (Trente Glorieuses), Italy (Italian economic miracle), and Greece (Greek economic miracle).

With the 1970s energy crisis, the abandonment of both the gold standard and the Bretton Woods system along with Keynesian social democratic, mixed-economy policies and the implementation of market-oriented, monetarist, and neoliberal policies (privatization, deregulation, free trade, economic globalization, and anti-inflationary fiscal policy, among others), the social democratic welfare state was put in doubt. This caused several social democratic parties to adopt the Third Way, a centrist ideology combining progressivism and social liberalism with neoliberalism; however, the Great Recession in the late 2000s and early 2010s cast doubts on the Washington Consensus, and protests against austerity measures ensued. There was a resurgence of social democratic parties and policies, especially in the United States and the United Kingdom, with the rise of politicians such as Bernie Sanders and Jeremy Corbyn, who rejected the Third Way, after the economic recession caused the Pasokification of many social democratic parties.

The United Nations World Happiness Report shows that the happiest nations are concentrated in social democratic nations, especially in Northern Europe, where the Nordic model is applied. This is at times attributed to the success of the social democratic Nordic model in the region, where similar democratic socialist, labourist, and social democratic parties dominated the region's political scene and laid the ground for their universal welfare states in the 20th century. The Nordic countries, including Denmark, Finland, Iceland, Norway, and Sweden, as well as Greenland and the Faroe Islands, also ranks highest on the metrics of real GDP per capita, economic equality, public health, life expectancy, solidarity, perceived freedom to make life choices, generosity, quality of life, and human development, while countries practising a neoliberal form of government have registered relatively poorer results. Similarly, several reports have listed Scandinavian and other social democratic countries as ranking high on indicators such as civil liberties, democracy, press, labour and economic freedoms, peace, and freedom from corruption. Numerous studies and surveys indicate that people live happier lives in countries ruled by social democratic parties than those ruled by neoliberal, centrist, and right-wing governments.

Criticism 

Other socialists criticize social democracy because it serves to devise new means to strengthen the capitalist system, which conflicts with the socialist goal of replacing capitalism with a socialist system. According to this view, social democracy fails to address the systemic issues inherent in capitalism. The American democratic socialist philosopher David Schweickart contrasts social democracy with democratic socialism by defining the former as an attempt to strengthen the welfare state and the latter as an alternative economic system to capitalism. According to Schweickart, the democratic socialist critique of social democracy is that capitalism can never be sufficiently humanized and that any attempt to suppress its economic contradictions will only cause them to emerge elsewhere. He gives the example that attempts to reduce unemployment too much would result in inflation, and too much job security would erode labour discipline. In contrast to social democracy's mixed economy, democratic socialists advocate a post-capitalist economic system based on either a market economy combined with workers' self-management or on some form of participatory, decentralized planning of the economy.

Marxian socialists argue that social democratic welfare policies cannot resolve the fundamental structural issues of capitalism, such as cyclical fluctuations, exploitation, and alienation. Accordingly, social democratic programs intended to ameliorate living conditions in capitalism, such as unemployment benefits and taxation on profits, creates further contradictions by further limiting the efficiency of the capitalist system by reducing incentives for capitalists to invest in further production. The welfare state only serves to legitimize and prolong the exploitative and contradiction-laden system of capitalism to society's detriment. Critics of contemporary social democracy, such as Jonas Hinnfors, argue that when social democracy abandoned Marxism, it also abandoned socialism and became a liberal capitalist movement, effectively making social democrats similar to non-socialist parties like the Democratic Party in the United States.

Market socialism is also critical of social democratic welfare states. While one common goal of both concepts is to achieve greater social and economic equality, market socialism does so through changes in enterprise ownership and management. Social democracy attempts to do so by subsidies and taxes on privately owned enterprises to finance welfare programs. Franklin Delano Roosevelt III (grandson of United States President Franklin D. Roosevelt) and David Belkin criticize social democracy for maintaining a property-owning capitalist class with an active interest in reversing social democratic welfare policies and a disproportionate amount of power as a class to influence government policy. The economists John Roemer and Pranab Bardhan point out that social democracy requires a strong labour movement to sustain its heavy redistribution through taxes and that it is idealistic to think such redistribution can be accomplished in other countries with weaker labour movements, noting that social democracy in Scandinavian countries has been in decline as the labour movement weakened.

Some critics say social democracy abandoned socialism in the 1930s by endorsing Keynesian welfare capitalism. The democratic socialist political theorist Michael Harrington argued that social democracy historically supported Keynesianism as part of a "social democratic compromise" between capitalism and socialism. Although this compromise did not allow for the immediate creation of socialism, it created welfare states and "recognized noncapitalist, and even anticapitalist, principles of human need over and above the imperatives of profit". Social democrats in favour of the Third Way have been accused of endorsing capitalism, including anti-Third Way social democrats who have accused Third Way proponents such as Anthony Giddens of being anti-social democratic and anti-socialist in practice.

Social democracy's reformism has been criticized by both the left and right, for if the left was to govern a capitalist economy, it would have to do so according to capitalist, not socialist, logic. This argument was previously echoed by Joseph Schumpeter in Capitalism, Socialism and Democracy (1942), writing: "Socialists had to govern in an essentially capitalist world..., a social and economic system that would not function except on capitalist lines. ... If they were to run it, they would have to run it according to its own logic. They would have to "administer" capitalism". Irving Kristol argued: "Democratic socialism turns out to be an inherently unstable compound, a contradiction in terms. Every social democratic party, once in power, soon finds itself choosing, at one point after another, between the socialist society it aspires to and the liberal society that lathered it". Joseph Stalin was a vocal critic of reformist social democrats, later coining the term social fascism to describe social democracy in the 1930s because, in this period, it embraced a similar corporatist economic model to the model supported by fascism. This view was adopted by the Communist International, which argued that capitalist society had entered the Third Period in which a proletarian revolution was imminent but could be prevented by social democrats and other fascist forces.

See also 

 Economic progressivism
 History of the Social Democratic Party of Austria
 History of the Social Democratic Party of Germany
 International Group of Democratic Socialists
 List of anti-capitalist and communist parties with national parliamentary representation
 List of social democratic and democratic socialist parties that have governed
 List of democratic socialist parties and organizations
 List of democratic socialists
 List of Labour parties
 List of left-wing political parties
 List of social democratic parties
 List of social democrats
 Social Democratic Party
 Socialist Party
 Socialist Union of Central-Eastern Europe

References

Citations

Notes

Sources

Books

Conferences

Encyclopedias

Journals

News

Speeches

Websites

Further reading

External links 

 
 

Social democracy
Capitalist systems
Centre-left politics
Centrism
Political philosophy
Types of democracy
Types of socialism
Anti-capitalism
Anti-Stalinist left
Centre-left ideologies
Democracy
Democratic socialism
Economic ideologies
Ideologies of capitalism
Economic progressivism
Left-wing ideologies
Liberal socialism
Capitalism
Anti-fascism
Mixed economies
Political-economic models
Political ideologies
Progressivism
Social justice
Democracy
Socialism
Welfare economics